She Who Must Burn is a 2015 horror film that was directed by Larry Kent. He co-wrote the film with Shane Twerdun, who also stars. The movie had its world premiere on 26 July 2015 at the Fantasia Film Festival and stars Sarah Smyth as a woman who finds herself the target of anti-abortion activists.

Synopsis
Angela (Sarah Smyth) used to work at a doctor's office that was shut down after its doctor was shot to death by anti-abortion protester Abraham Baarker (James Wilson), who was arrested soon after. Undeterred, Angela decides to open a home clinic where she provides basic services – something that puts her at odds with the rest of the Baarker family, who believes that she is performing abortions. They also believe that she's to blame for recent infant deaths (implied to be due to water pollution), which they see as a sign of God's disapproval. Things are made more tense when Angela helps the wife (Jewel Staite) of one of the Baarkers flee an abusive marriage.

Cast
 Sarah Smyth as Angela
 Shane Twerdun as Jeremiah Baarker
 Jewel Staite as Margaret Baarker
 James Wilson as Abraham Baarker
 Missy Cross as Rebecca Baarker
 Andrew Dunbar as Caleb Baarker
 Jim Francis as Sheriff
 Andrew Moxham as Mac
 Bart Anderson as Errol
 Steve Bradley as Daryl
 Pericles Creticos as Demetrius
 Havana Guppy as Annie

Reception
Critical reception has been positive. Variety gave She Who Must Burn a positive review, comparing it favorably to films like The Sacrament and Holy Ghost People. Twitch Film remarked that the movie was "not an easy film to watch, its power will either dig deep into you to horrify or elicit uncomfortable laughter at how in-your-face it play its drama. The film seems practically designed to make distributors, programmers and other content providers run for the hills. I'm old enough to remember when they called that sort of thing art." Dread Central gave the film an extremely positive review and praised it for its visuals and acting.

References

External links
 

Canadian horror films
Canadian independent films
2015 horror films
English-language Canadian films
Films directed by Larry Kent
2010s English-language films
2010s Canadian films